Ken Fletcher and Margaret Smith successfully defended their title, defeating Dennis Ralston and Billie Jean King in the final, 4–6, 6–3, 6–3 to win the mixed doubles tennis title at the 1966 Wimbledon Championships.

Seeds

  Ken Fletcher /  Margaret Smith (champions)
 n/a
  Dennis Ralston /  Billie Jean King (final)
  Fred Stolle /  Françoise Dürr (semifinals)

Draw

Finals

Top half

Section 1

Section 2

Section 3

Section 4

Bottom half

Section 5

Section 6

Section 7

Section 8

References

External links

X=Mixed Doubles
Wimbledon Championship by year – Mixed doubles